The Seatonian Prize is awarded by the University of Cambridge for the best English poem on a sacred subject. This prize has been awarded annually since 1750 and is open to any Master of Arts of the university. Lord Byron referred to this prize in his 1809 poem entitled 'English Bards and Scots Reviewers.' The prize is still awarded annually, with a deadline of 30 September each year. It is open to all members of the Senate of the University of Cambridge, and all persons who are possessors of the status of Masters of Arts.

Founding 
This prize was founded by the Rev. Thomas Seaton, educated at Stamford School and a Fellow of Clare College, who died in 1741. The prize was financed by the revenue from his Kislingbury estate bequeathed to the University. His bequest was not formally accepted by the University until 1898, at which time regulations were drawn up for the administration of the Seatonian Prize by the Faculty of Divinity.

Winners 
The winner in the first three years was Christopher Smart. "On the Omniscience of the Supreme Being" (Cambridge, 1752) was his prize-winning "poetical essay" of that year. Smart won much credit by his success. In 1754 his fellowship was extended on condition that he continued to write for the prize. In 1759 the prize was won by Beilby Porteus for his poem on "Death", for which he is still remembered. In 1797, 1798, and 1799 the prize was won by William Bolland. 

Byron's poem records the name of some of the winners:

Shall hoary Granta call her sable sons,

Expert in science, more expert at puns?

Shall these approach the Muse? ah, no! she flies,

Even from the tempting ore of Seaton's prize;

Though Printers condescend the press to soil

With rhyme by Hoare, and epic blank by Hoyle:

Not him whose page, if still upheld by whist,

Requires no sacred theme to bid us list.

Ye! who in Granta's honours would surpass,

Must mount her Pegasus, a full-grown ass;⁠

A foal well worthy of her ancient Dam,

Whose Helicon is duller than her Cam.

In 2018, the Seatonian Prize was awarded to Colin Wilcockson of Pembroke College.

List of winners

1902: Rev. John Hudson, Peterhouse, "Cyrus and the restoration of the Jews"

Further reading 
  Reprinted in 1808 as two 2 volumes. Cambridge, J.Deighton.

References

British poetry awards
1750 establishments in England
Awards established in 1750
Awards and prizes of the University of Cambridge
Christian poetry